Potato Creek is a stream in the U.S. state of South Dakota. It is a tributary of the White River.

Potato Creek was so named on account of the wild potatoes Indians harvested as a food source along the creek's course.

See also
List of rivers of South Dakota

References

Rivers of Bennett County, South Dakota
Rivers of Jackson County, South Dakota
Rivers of South Dakota